Pontypridd United AFC is a Welsh football club, based in Pontypridd. The club play at USW Sports Park on Treforest Industrial Estate.  The club plays in the Cymru Premier.

History

1990s
The club was formed in 1992 after Pontypridd Sports & Social Club merged with another team, Ynysybwl. They played at Ynysangharad Park in Pontypridd .It was decided in their second season at the Park that they should be called Pontypridd Town AFC.

2000s
In April 2006, former Cardiff City player Ryan Nicholls earned success at the first attempt as the club  beat Cardiff Corries 4–1 to secure promotion for the 2006–07 season to the Welsh Football League First Division. Nicholls also took the club to round four of the Welsh Cup. Earlier in the competition, they had knocked out the Division Two and Division One champions, Pontardawe Town & Ton Pentre, as well as the biggest giant-killing of the season – a 1–0 home win over Welsh Premier League side Aberystwyth Town.

The team manager for the 2007–08 season was Mal Camilleri but after the club's successive relegations down to Division Three, the club was on the brink of collapse. Discussions between Pontypridd Town and Treforest began. At the 11th hour, the club received support from local businessman Clayton Jones and was saved. In 2009 Cardiff businessman Phil Gibb joined the club and Allan Davies was appointed as Manager. Davies was an experienced defender who also coached at Graig FC in 2008 and previously spent ten years at Burton Albion where he played under Nigel Clough.

2010s
In the 2010–11 season, the team started erratically, but from January they lost just two out of 20 games and they were on top of the table for more than two months. In the last week of the season, although they won the last game, they missed out on promotion to Division 2 on goal difference.

The 2013–14 season started with a change of management. Dominic Broad was appointed Manager, bringing in his brother Damien Broad as his Assistant Manager and Sam Houldsworth as First-team coach. A week before the season started the club only had only 2 signed players, the others having followed Allan Davies out of the club. They quickly set about signing enough players to field a team for the first match and set themselves the target of maintaining Welsh League status, which they achieved by finishing 15th that year.

On 29 July 2014, Ponty played a pre-season friendly against Valencia CF Mestalla, the second team of Spanish La Liga giants Valencia CF. In the run-up to the game, TalkSPORT radio presenter Colin Murray picked up on news of the match as it gathered national media attention and decided to come and watch the game, inviting any of his listeners to join him. Well over 100 people from around the UK booked their flights to Valencia and spent 3 days supporting the club. Against this professional team, the club came away with a 3–0 defeat.

In the summer of 2015, Assistant Manager Damien Broad took over the Manager's position from his brother Dominic due to work commitments; Dominic remained as Player/Assistant Manager. On 29 July 2015, exactly a year after the Valencia game, the club repeated it's feat by securing another high-profile friendly in Spain, this time against Deportivo de La Coruña.

In January 2016 Manager Damien Broad left the club having secured a prestigious coaching role with Manchester City based in China. Dominic Broad returned as Manager and lead the club to the Division Three title, breaking the club record for most wins in a season (25) with  goalkeeper Ryan Griffiths breaking the club record for most Clean Sheets (14).

The talkSPORT Trophy: On 11 May 2016, almost 1,600 supporters from around the UK gathered in Ynysangharad Park to see Ponty Town take on the talkSPORT All-Stars. The brainchild of Dominic Broad and talksSPORT Radio presenter Colin Murray, the match saw a team of ex. professional footballers, other sportsmen and celebrities descended on Pontypridd in the inaugural talkSPORT Trophy. The All Stars fielded names including Danny Murphy, Dietmar Hamann, Danny Gabbidon, Simon Davies, Matthew Etherington, Micky Grey, Perry Groves, Martyn Williams, Mike Tindall, Sonny Pike, Max Rushden and Colin Murray. The club won the game 3–1 with goals from Luke Gullick, Scott Hillman and Omar Abdillahi, with a consolation penalty coming in the last minute for the All-Stars' Micky Grey.

After a successful 2015–16 season, the club sealed the Welsh Football League Division Three title in May 2016 after a 2–0 victory away at Tredegar Town. After their title-winning season, the club made several changes in the management team in their fierst season back in the Welsh Football League Division Two. Damien Broad returned in a Head Coach role at the club and alongside spending his days working at Bristol City's prestigious youth academy, whilst Welsh League veteran Phil Clay came in to replace Sam Houldsworth as Assistant Manager.

The Football Association of Wales were introducing the new Tier 2 Ground regulations for the 2018–19 season and Pontypridd Town's Ynysangharad Park did not comply with the new standards.  After exploring a number of ground options with various parties including the local authority and Pontypridd RFC,  the club approached the University of South Wales (USW) about the use of their Sports Campus on Treforest Industrial Estate and proceeded to use these facilities from the start of the 2017–18 campaign.

The club under Dom and Damien Broad had a tremendous season and obtained promotion to Welsh Football League Division One  as runners up as well as getting to the fourth round of the Welsh Cup (eliminated by Penydarren BGC, then of the South Wales Alliance League). Unfortunately the new University of South Wales Tier 2 level facility was held up which meant the club either had to turn down promotion or find a ground share at a Tier 2 ground. After being turned down by Merthyr Town, Cambrian & Clydach and Ystrad Mynach Sports Centre, the club were helped by the Cardiff Athletic Stadium to start their season in the First Division after an FAW appeal. Due to excessive wear of the new surface at the Stadium the club had to find another ground after playing half the season there. Aberdare Town gave the club permission to play at their Aberaman Park tier 2 ground for the remainder of the season.

The club appointed Lee Kendall as their new Manager with eleven games to go to the end of the season to replace the Broad brothers who left due to personal reasons. Kendall is a fully qualified 'A' licence coach both for outfield players as well as goalkeepers. Kendall left The Dragons at the end of the 2018–19 season. His assistant, Jonathan Jones, was appointed as his successor for the inaugural Cymru South campaign.

2020s
The club finished as runners-up in the 2021–22 Cymru South season and were promoted to the Cymru Premier after champions Llantwit Major were not awarded Tier 1 status by the Football Association of Wales. Jones resigned as manager at the end of the season.

The club was renamed from Pontypridd Town to Pontypridd United in June 2022, prior to the club's first season in the Cymru Premier.

Current squad

Technical staff

Honours
Welsh Football League
Division 3 Winners: 2015–16
Division 2 Promotion: 2017–18

Final league positions

References

External links
 Official website

 
Association football clubs established in 1992
Football clubs in Wales
Pontypridd
1992 establishments in Wales
Welsh Football League clubs
Cymru South clubs
Sport in Rhondda Cynon Taf